"Colour of Love" is a song by Norwegian Eurodance group , consisting of model and singer , Njaal Lie and Svenna Mohaugen. Produced by Espen Berg and released in 1995 as the second single from their only album, Compromise (1995), it also features English vocalist, rapper, and DJ Ricardo da Force, known from acts like The KLF and N-Trance. It peaked at number six on the Norwegian single chart VG-lista, and number three on the radio chart Ti i skuddet. This was the first CD-single in Norway to include the music video as an interactive bonus for CD-ROM, for PC and Mac.

Music video
The accompanying music video for "Colour of Love" was directed by London-based director Max Abbiss-Biro and features all band members with Ricardo da Force.

Track listing
 CD maxi, Norway
"Colour of Love" (Interactive Bonus) (music video)   
"Colour of Love" – 3:14
"Colour of Love" (Original Radiomix) – 3:19
"Colour of Love" (Daydreemermix) – 7:25
"Colour of Love" (Pianomix) – 8:25

Charts

References
 

1995 singles
1995 songs
Trancylvania songs
EMI Records singles
English-language Norwegian songs